The men's shot put event was part of the track and field athletics programme at the 1952 Summer Olympics in Helsinki, Finland. Twenty athletes from 14 nations competed. The maximum number of athletes per nation had been set at 3 since the 1930 Olympic Congress. The competition was held on 21 July at Helsinki Olympic Stadium. The finals were swept by the United States, with Americans Parry O'Brien taking the gold medal, Darrow Hooper earning silver and Jim Fuchs receiving his second consecutive bronze medal in the event. It was the 10th victory for an American in the event, and the fifth medal sweep for the United States. Fuchs was the third man to win multiple medals in the shot put.

Summary

While recuperating from surgery to deal with a knee injury, Fuchs developed a technique he called "the sideways glide" which enabled him to compete without pain and gain greater distance on his tosses. Fuchs, who was the world record holder at the time of the games, was nursing a pulled ligament in his right hand, which interfered with his ability to compete. In the years after his bronze medal performance at the 1948 Summer Olympics in London, Fuchs was the best shot putter in the world, winning 88 consecutive meets and setting four world records in a stretch of 14 months.

Using a technique that became known as the "O'Brien glide", Parry O'Brien broke Fuchs's consecutive meet winning streak and started a streak of his own that ran from July 1952 to June 1956 in which he won 116 consecutive meets and set 17 world records, in addition to becoming the first person to break through the distances of 18 meters, 60 feet and 19 meters. Parry would go on to repeat his gold medal performance at the 1956 Summer Olympics in Melbourne and win a silver medal at the 1960 Summer Olympics in Rome, before falling just out of the medals in the 1964 Summer Olympics in Tokyo.

Hooper beat both O'Brien and Fuchs in the 1952 Final Trials with a throw of 17.41m (57–1), a distance that would have won him a gold medal if he had been able to repeat it in Helsinki In the first round of the final O'Brien reached a distance of 17.41 (57–1), which gave him the lead, holding on until the final round when Hooper's 17.39 (57–0) put him just two centimeters short of a gold medal.

Background

This was the 12th appearance of the event, which is one of 12 athletics events to have been held at every Summer Olympics. Returning finalists from the 1948 Games were bronze medalist Jim Fuchs of the United States, ninth-place finisher Konstantinos Giataganas of Greece, and eleventh-place finisher John Giles of Great Britain. The American team was favored to repeat its medal sweep of 1948, with Fuchs (now the world record holder), Parry O'Brien, and Darrow Hooper all within two inches of each other at the U.S. trials, with Hooper winning at 17.41 metres.

Puerto Rico and the Soviet Union each made their debut in the men's shot put. The United States appeared for the 12th time, the only nation to have competed in all Olympic shot put competitions to date.

Competition format

The competition used the two-round format introduced in 1936, with the qualifying round completely separate from the divided final. In qualifying, each athlete received three attempts; those recording a mark of at least 14.60 metres advanced to the final. If fewer than 12 athletes achieved that distance, the top 12 would advance. The results of the qualifying round were then ignored. Finalists received three throws each, with the top six competitors receiving an additional three attempts. The best distance among those six throws counted.

Records

Prior to the competition, the existing world and Olympic records were as follows.

Parry O'Brien broke the Olympic record with his first throw of the final, at 17.41 metres. This was the best throw of the day, though O'Brien's second throw (17.21 metres) and Darrow Hooper's final throw (17.39 metres) also exceeded the old record.

Schedule

All times are Eastern European Summer Time (UTC+3)

Results

Qualifying round

Qualification: Qualifying Performance 14.60 (Q) advance to the final.

Final

References

Athletics at the 1952 Summer Olympics
Shot put at the Olympics
Men's events at the 1952 Summer Olympics